The women's 100 metres hurdles event at the 2001 Summer Universiade was held at the Workers Stadium in Beijing, China on 27–29 August.

Medalists

Results

Heats
Wind:Heat 1: +0.7 m/s, Heat 2: +1.5 m/s, Heat 3: +1.4 m/s, Heat 4: +1.4 m/s

Semifinals
Wind:Heat 1: +0.4 m/s, Heat 2: -1.2 m/s

Final
Wind: -0.1 m/s

References

Athletics at the 2001 Summer Universiade
2001 in women's athletics
2001